Endothecium may refer to:

 Endothecium, a type of tissue in anthers that leads to dehiscence
 Endothecium, a synonym for a genus of hydrozoans, Halecium